José Manuel Gomes de Andrade (born 1 June 1970), also known as Zé de Angola, is a  Cape Verdean retired professional footballer who played as a striker. He also held Portuguese nationality, due to the many years he spent in the country.

Football career
Born in São Vicente, Cape Verde, Andrade spent most of his early career in the second and third divisions of Portuguese football, never appearing in the top level and mainly representing Académico de Viseu FC. Also in the 90s, he had two spells in England with Stoke City, one on loan, making a total of 16 league appearances for the Potters.

A player of slight build, Andrade broke his leg during a second division game at Swindon Town in April 1995, and returned to Portugal during the summer to regain fitness. He returned to Stoke two years later but, although he was a big hit with the supporters, he failed to settle in England and was released after five months.

After two unassuming years in the Portuguese second level, with only 21 games combined for F.C. Maia and Gil Vicente FC, Andrade – known as Zé de Angola (Angola's Zé – short for Joseph) during his spell in the country – spent four seasons in Angola with Atlético Sport Aviação. He would retire at the age of 40, after eight years with three clubs in Luxembourg.

Personal life
Andrade's son Bruno, also became a professional footballer.

Career statistics

Club
Source:

International
Source:

References

External links
 
 

1970 births
Living people
People from São Vicente, Cape Verde
Portuguese sportspeople of Cape Verdean descent
Portuguese footballers
Cape Verdean footballers
Association football forwards
Liga Portugal 2 players
Segunda Divisão players
Associação Académica de Coimbra – O.A.F. players
Académico de Viseu F.C. players
Gil Vicente F.C. players
F.C. Maia players
English Football League players
Stoke City F.C. players
FC Avenir Beggen players
Cape Verde international footballers
Portuguese expatriate footballers
Cape Verdean expatriate footballers
Expatriate footballers in Portugal
Expatriate footballers in England
Expatriate footballers in Angola
Expatriate footballers in Luxembourg